The 130s decade ran from January 1, 130, to December 31, 139.

Significant people 
 Hadrian, Roman Emperor

References